Melissa Marie Benoist (born October 4, 1988) is an American actress, singer and producer. Her first major role was Marley Rose on the Fox musical comedy drama Glee (2012–2014), where she was a series regular during the fifth season. She rose to widespread prominence for portraying the title character on the CBS / CW superhero series Supergirl (2015–2021), along with related media in the Arrowverse franchise.

Benoist's film appearances include the psychological drama Whiplash (2014), the comedy drama Danny Collins (2015), the crime comedy Band of Robbers (2015), the romantic Western The Longest Ride (2015), the action thriller Patriots Day (2016), the drama Lowriders (2016), and the comedy drama Sun Dogs (2017). She also portrayed the wife of cult leader David Koresh on the Paramount Network miniseries Waco (2018). On stage, Benoist made her Broadway debut in 2018 as Carole King in the jukebox musical Beautiful: The Carole King Musical.

Early life and education 
Benoist was born in Houston, Texas, to Julie and Jim Benoist, a physician. They divorced when she was thirteen years old. Her paternal great-grandfather was of French descent. She has two sisters: Jessica, a novelist, and Kristina, an ecological scientist, and five half-siblings from her father's remarriage. She was raised mostly by her mother in the suburbs of Denver, Colorado, after her parents' separation. Growing up in Colorado, a large part of her childhood was spent exploring national parks and immersing herself in nature.

She started dance classes at the age of three, focusing on jazz, ballet, and tap. When she was four years old, her aunt put her in a church play she was directing; after that, she began doing community children's theatre in her hometown.

As a teenager, Benoist performed anonymously at Disneyland in various medleys of musical songs for three summers with the Academy of Theatre Arts, a musical theatre school she was attending, located in Littleton, Colorado, run by Paul Dwyer and Alann Worley. She performed locally in a number of theatrical productions, including A Month in the Country, Cinderella, A Chorus Line, and Bye Bye Birdie at the Town Hall Arts Center, a professional theatre located in the Denver metro area. Instead of attending high school graduation parties, she performed the play Evita with other cast members at the former Country Dinner Playhouse.

In 2006, The Denver Post named Benoist one of Colorado's five "Can't Miss Kids". She graduated from Arapahoe High School in Centennial, Colorado, in 2007, and then moved to New York City to pursue a career in musical theatre. She initially attended Marymount Manhattan College for the BFA musical theatre program but in her sophomore year, she switched majors to theatre, due to her admiration for 19th-century Russian plays. She graduated from Marymount Manhattan College with a Bachelor of Arts in Theatre Arts in 2011. While attending college, she played Millie Dilmount in an urban off-off-Broadway production of Thoroughly Modern Millie and Rosalind in As You Like It at the Theresa Lang Theatre.

Career

2008–2011: Early work 
Benoist's first film was Tennessee in 2008 along with singer Mariah Carey. Afterwards, she made guest appearances on shows like Law & Order: Criminal Intent, Blue Bloods, Homeland, and The Good Wife, while attending college. She played Kelly in the 2011 Goodspeed Musicals theatrical production of The Unauthorized Autobiography of Samantha Brown by Bree Lowdermilk and Kait Kerrigan at the Norma Terris Theatre.

2012–2014: Rise to prominence with Glee and film roles 

In May 2012, she auditioned for the musical comedy-drama series Glee in New York at the Roundabout Theatre Company, singing a different song for each of her five auditions including: "Fidelity" by Regina Spektor, "King of Anything" by Sara Bareilles, a Colbie Caillat song, and several musical theatre pieces. In July, she had two screen tests in California for series creator/writer, Ryan Murphy, the casting directors, and executive producers. She portrayed Marley Rose on the fourth and fifth seasons of Glee. Her first appearance as Marley Rose was in the first episode of season four, titled "The New Rachel". Because the creators had been looking for Marley for a long time, she started working the day she found out she got the job. Benoist's first performance was a duet of "New York State of Mind" with Lea Michele, during the first episode of season 4. The cover of the song reached twenty-four on the Bubbling Under Hot 100 Singles chart. She and Glee co-star Darren Criss appeared with Josh Duhamel in the opening of the 2013 Kids' Choice Awards. That same year, she was selected as an ambassador for Coca-Cola's new product, P10 300 mL Coke Mismo. In June 2013, they were flown to Manila, Philippines, to endorse the product by visiting various malls and meeting with fans. She, along with several other actors, was not called back for Glee in early 2014.

In mid-2013, Benoist and Blake Jenner held a Kickstarter campaign to help fund the production of their feature film Billy Boy. The project reached its $100,000 goal. Benoist played Nicole in  Damien Chazelle's 2014 independent drama film Whiplash, which won top prizes (Grand Jury and Audience awards) at the 2014 Sundance Film Festival. In June 2014, she joined Nicholas Sparks' film adaption The Longest Ride as Marcia. She had a role in the 2015 film Danny Collins. She played the part of Jamie, a desk clerk at a hotel frequented by one of Jamie's all-time favorite rock stars. That same year, Benoist also played Becky Thatcher in Band of Robbers, a modern-day retelling of The Adventures of Tom Sawyer and Adventures of Huckleberry Finn. In May 2015, it was announced that Benoist would be playing Lorelai in the film Low Riders, replacing Lily Collins and Nicola Peltz, who were in talks for the role previously. In August of that year, she landed the leading role in the Screen Gems drama feature film Oxford.

2015–present: Supergirl and Broadway debut 
In October 2015, the superhero adventure series Supergirl, with Benoist in the lead role of Kara Zor-El, premiered on CBS. She became the first woman to lead a prime time superhero TV series since Wonder Woman went off the air in 1979 and Lindsay Wagner’s The Bionic Woman in 1978. The premiere was watched by 12.96million viewers and received a full season order by CBS on November 30, 2015. She was reportedly the first actress looked at for the role. Benoist generally received positive reviews for her portrayal of Kara Zor-El. The series later moved to The CW before its second-season premiere. She reprised her role in The CW's Arrowverse crossovers "Invasion!", "Crisis on Earth-X", "Elseworlds", and "Crisis on Infinite Earths" as well as The Flash musical episode "Duet". She reprised her role as Earth-X's Supergirl doppelgänger Overgirl in the CW Seed animated series Freedom Fighters: The Ray. The actress made her directorial debut for one episode during season five. For her portrayal of Supergirl, she received the Breakthrough Performance Award at The 42nd Saturn Awards and two Best Actress on a Television Series Award at the 44th and 45th Saturn Awards respectively. The series concluded on November 9, 2021, after six seasons and 126 episodes.

In May 2016, Benoist was cast as Katherine Russell, the widow of deceased Boston Marathon bomber Tamerlan Tsarnaev, in Peter Berg's drama film Patriots Day. In June, it was announced that she was set to star in the comedy-drama film Sun Dogs. Also in that month, the Human Rights Campaign released a video in tribute to the victims of the Orlando nightclub shooting; in the video, Benoist and others told the stories of the people killed there. In April 2017, Benoist was cast as Rachel Koresh, the legal wife of Branch Davidian cult leader David Koresh in Paramount Network's miniseries Waco. Benoist was featured in "The Super Duper Minecraft Musical!" which was made for Minecraft's Super Duper Graphics Pack in November.

On May 7, 2018, it was announced that Benoist would be playing the titular character in the Broadway show Beautiful: The Carole King Musical at the Stephen Sondheim Theatre, which marked her Broadway debut for a limited run from June 7 through August 4, 2018. Benoist stated that the run felt like “coming home” to her theater roots and a “manifestation of a lot of her childhood dreams,” as theater was her first passion. In February 2021, she started a production company, Three Things Productions, with an overall deal at Warner Bros. 

In June 2022, it was announced that Benoist and her production company Three Things Productions has renewed its overall deal with Warner Bros. Television Group and that she will officially join the HBO Max series The Girls on the Bus inspired by a chapter in Amy Chozick’s 2018 novel Chasing Hillary, which was based on the author’s time covering Hillary Clinton’s 2016 presidential campaign as a political reporter. Deadline revealed in February that Benoist was in talks to reunite with Berlanti Productions for the political campaign drama series. In June, it was confirmed that she will star as Sadie McCarthy, a journalist who romanticizes Tim Crouse's Boys on the Bus book and who scrapped her whole life for her own shot at covering a presidential campaign. Benoist will also serve as a producer for the series.

Other ventures

On October 26, 2021, she published her first book, Haven’s Secret, the first installment of The Powers series from Abrams Kids. The series is a middle grade fantasy and was co-written by Benoist with her sister Jessica Benoist and author Mariko Tamaki. Haven's Secret received recognition as a 2022 Kansas Notable Book in June of 2022.

Personal life 
During her first semester in college, when she was learning to ride a bike, a cab backed into her and left a visible scar above her eyebrows. She also has a tattoo of a bicycle on her left foot.

In 2015, it was announced that she and her Glee co-star Blake Jenner were married. Benoist commented that they had been married "longer than anybody knows", with some sources claiming that the couple actually wed the same year of their engagement in 2013. In late December 2016, she filed for divorce citing "irreconcilable differences". The divorce was finalized in December 2017.

Also in 2015, Benoist suffered an injury that tore her iris. The incident caused one pupil to be enlarged. In November 2019, Benoist shared an Instagram video chronicling her experience as a survivor of domestic violence in order to raise awareness. She revealed that the injury to her iris was due to an iPhone being thrown at her during a domestic dispute, in a relationship marked by repeated abuse. Previously, the injury had been said to have been caused when she tripped down stairs and fell into a potted plant. Benoist also stated in her video that she had experienced extreme control, manipulation, and cycles of severe violence including being slapped, punched, shoved into a wall, dragged by her hair, and choked during the relationship. In October 2020, her ex-husband Blake Jenner wrote a lengthy Instagram post in which he admitted to causing the eye injury and confirmed the infliction of abuse throughout the relationship. He also stated that she had physically assaulted him at other times, resulting in injury. Benoist previously stated in her original video that she began fighting back in defense against Jenner's attacks during the relationship. Benoist has discussed healing from the trauma of the relationship and stated that doing EMDR therapy saved her life.  

In 2016, Benoist met Chris Wood when he was cast as Mon-El in season 2 of Supergirl and their romantic relationship was confirmed in 2017. On the relationship she recalls, “we met each other at the perfect time in our lives.” In October 2017, Benoist helped with Wood's launch of his campaign "IDONTMIND" which works to decrease stigma around mental health and provide resources and education. She discussed her own struggle with depression and anxiety attacks since she was 13 years old. She said that Wood's words encouraged her to share her own issues with depression with others. Benoist and Wood announced their engagement on February 10, 2019, and married in September 2019, holding a private ceremony in Ojai, California. On March 4, 2020, the couple announced on Instagram that they were expecting their first child. They announced the birth of their son on September 25, 2020.

Filmography

Film

Television

Web

Theatre

Soundtrack performances

Awards and nominations

Notes

References

External links 

 
 
 

1988 births
21st-century American actresses
21st-century American women singers
Actresses from Colorado
Actresses from Houston
American child actresses
American expatriates in Canada
American film actresses
American stage actresses
American television actresses
Living people
Marymount Manhattan College alumni
People from Littleton, Colorado
American people of French descent